A partial solar eclipse occurred on July 22, 1971. This was the 70th and final solar eclipse from Solar Saros 116.

Half-Saros cycle 
Solar Saros 116 and Lunar Saros 109

Solar eclipse of June 19, 1917

Solar eclipse of June 30, 1935

July 1944 lunar eclipse

Solar eclipse of July 11, 1953

July 1962 lunar eclipse

Solar eclipse of July 22, 1971

July 1980 lunar eclipse

August 1998 lunar eclipse

August 2016 lunar eclipse

Related eclipses

Solar eclipses of 1971–1974

Metonic cycle

Half-Saros cycle
A solar eclipse will be preceded and followed by lunar eclipses by 9 years and 5.5 days (a half saros). This solar eclipse is related to two penumbral lunar eclipses of Lunar Saros 109 on the first and second columns.

From the Earth

From the Moon

References

External links 

1971 in science
1971 7 22
July 1971 events